Mariam Kevkhishvili Machavariani (born 17 September 1985) is a Georgian shot putter.

Kevkhishvili attended the University of Florida in Gainesville, Florida, where she was a member of coach Mike Holloway's Florida Gators track and field team.  She graduated from the university with a bachelor's degree in sociology in 2011.

She finished tenth at the 2005 Summer Universiade. In addition she competed at the Olympic Games in 2004 and 2008 without reaching the final round.

Her personal best throw is 17.60 metres, achieved in April 2008 in Gainesville, Florida. She has 17.83 metres on the indoor track, achieved in March 2008 in Fayetteville, Arkansas.

Competition record

See also 

 Florida Gators
 List of University of Florida alumni
 List of University of Florida Olympians

References

External links 
 

1985 births
Living people
Sportspeople from Tbilisi
Athletes (track and field) at the 2004 Summer Olympics
Athletes (track and field) at the 2008 Summer Olympics
Florida Gators women's track and field athletes
Olympic athletes of Georgia (country)
Female shot putters from Georgia (country)
Competitors at the 2005 Summer Universiade